Benjamin Immanuel (also credited as Ben Ratner or Benjamin Ratner) is a Canadian actor and filmmaker. He is most noted for his performances in the films Last Wedding and Looking for Leonard.

Career 
Immanuel has appeared in the films Moving Malcolm, Ignition, Long Life, Happiness & Prosperity, Amazon Falls, Fathers & Sons and Sisters & Brothers, and regular supporting roles as Sam Berger in the television series Da Vinci's City Hall and Ivon Teslia in Travelers. He was also the director of Moving Malcolm.

For his role in Last Wedding, he won a Vancouver Film Critics Circle award for Best Actor in a Canadian Film in 2001. He won the VFCC's Best Supporting Actor in a Canadian Film award in 2002 for Looking for Leonard. He was also director of the film Down River, which won the VFCC's award for Best British Columbia film in 2013.

Personal life 
In 2021, having been credited as Benjamin Ratner or Ben Ratner since 1991, he chose to start using his middle name for future credits, thus Ben Immanuel, in order to avoid confusion with director Brett Ratner. He is married to actress Jennifer Spence.

Filmography

Film

Television

References

External links

21st-century Canadian male actors
21st-century Canadian screenwriters
Canadian male film actors
Canadian male television actors
Canadian male screenwriters
Film directors from Vancouver
Male actors from Vancouver
Writers from Vancouver
Living people
Year of birth missing (living people)